The 2022 AFL Women's draft consists of the various periods when the 18 clubs in the AFL Women's competition can recruit players prior to the competition's season seven.

Expansion club signing period
The expansion clubs Essendon, Hawthorn, Port Adelaide, and Sydney are able to sign up to 14 current AFLW players before the sign and trade period. They can also pre-list under-18 players from their Next Generation Academy (NGA) region or players as open-age signings if they previously nominated for the AFLW draft and aren't on a current list.

Signing and trading period 
Players can be signed for one or two year contracts.

Retirements and delistings

Trades

Delisted free agency 
The delisted free agency period closed on 25 June 2021.

Rookie signings 
In the absence of a rookie draft, each club was permitted to sign players that had not played Australian rules football within the previous three years or been involved in an AFLW high-performance program.

Inactive players

Draft 

The 2022 AFL Women's draft will take place on Wednesday, 29 June. The indicative draft order was updated following the sign and trade period:

Free agency and replacement signings 
Where players were moved to inactive list after the draft had taken place, club were entitled to replace them by free agency signing.

See also 
 2022 AFL draft

References

AFL Women's draft
AFL Women's season seven
AFL Women's draft